A Day is a 2017 South Korean mystery thriller film directed by Cho Sun-ho, starring Kim Myung-min and Byun Yo-han.

Plot 
The story starts with a doctor, Kim Joon-young, returning home. His daughter, Eun-jung, dies in a car accident on the same day along with another woman. Kim Joon-young wakes up in what looks like the previous day. He tries to save his daughter but fails, with the day repeating over and over again. The woman's husband also experiences the day repeatedly. They cannot seem to save their loved ones no matter what. Later, they find out that the father of a child whose heart was transplanted without the father's consent and the man who had caused an earlier accident are the two persons whose day is repeating, along with the child father, who is seeking revenge by killing their loved ones. They reconcile to the father after learning that his child's heart is inside of the daughter. Thus, the daughter does not allow his father to die so they save him so that everything returns to normal. The doctor explains the transplant to the press as the movie ends.

Cast 
Kim Myung-min as Kim Joon-young
Byun Yo-han as Lee Min-chul 
Yoo Jae-myung as Kang-sik
Jo Eun-hyung as Eun-jung 
Shin Hye-sun as Mi-kyung
Im Ji-kyu as Yong-sun 
Kim Chae-yeon as Hee-joo
Jang Dae-woong as Dong-soo 
Kim Hyeong-beom as Kim Kyung-wi 
Kim Ye-joon as Ha-roo
Lee Yoo-ha as Flight attendant 
Han Hee-jung as Suk-hoon's mother
Park Min-soo as Suk-ikjhu

Production 
A Day reunites the two main actors Kim Myung-min and Byun Yo-han who previously acted together in the historical drama series Six Flying Dragons.

Reception 
The film inspired a South Indian political drama movie Maanaadu, in which the protagonist is stuck in a time loop leading to a political assassination.

Awards and nominations

References

External links 

 

2017 films
South Korean mystery thriller films
Films about time
2010s mystery thriller films
2017 directorial debut films
Films about road accidents and incidents
Time loop films
2010s South Korean films
2010s Korean-language films